Biswell is a surname. Notable people with the surname include:

Andrew Biswell, British biographer
George Biswell (1904–1981), British footballer

See also
Bissell

English-language surnames